Vintry is one of the 25 wards of the City of London. Located within it is the City end of Southwark Bridge and, adjacent to that, the hall of the Worshipful Company of Vintners, the City livery company for the wine trade.

The ward's boundary is formed by Cannon Street to the north, College Hill and Cousin Lane to the east, the River Thames to the south, and its western edge follows an unusual line along part of Little Trinity Lane, Lambeth Hill and Distaff Lane.

The Christopher Wren-designed church St James Garlickhythe is within Vintry ward, near Mansion House tube station. In medieval times, French wine and garlic were landed at the nearby Garlickhythe ('garlic dock'). This circumstance led to the church being part of the route for English pilgrims travelling to the cathedral of Santiago de Compostela in Spain, which is sacred to the memory of St James the Great.

The ward contained Whittington's Longhouse, a 128-seat public toilet gifted by Dick Whittington.

Politics
Vintry is one of 25 wards in the City of London, each electing an alderman to the Court of Aldermen and  commoners (the City equivalent of a councillor) to the Court of Common Council of the City of London Corporation.

Only electors who are freemen of the City are eligible to stand for election.

Former churches
John Stow's A Survay of London lists four churches in Vintry ward:

External links
City Corporation Ward map (for 2003–13)
Vintry Ward newsletter
Vintry Ward Constable Profile
St James Parish News
Map of Early Modern London:  Vintry Ward - Historical Map and Encyclopedia of Shakespeare's London (Scholarly)
Vintry and Dowgate Wards Club
Joint Ward Club with Dowgate

References

Wards of the City of London